Nisha Singh is an Indian actress and singer who works in the Punjabi entertainment industry.

Early career 
She was born in Mansa, Punjab. She completed her schooling at Yogesh Memorial public school in Mansa, Punjab. She was very active in art & cultural activities during her school days. She has completed her graduation from SD College, Mansa. She has won many prizes in giddha during college youth festivals. She was first appeared in Punjabi television series with Bhagwant Mann. Meanwhile, Bano worked along with Binu Dhillon and Karamjit Anmol on various stages all around the world.

Career

Acting career 
Nisha Bano started her acting through a TV Show named "Hasde Hasande Ravo" telecasted on Channel MH1. Later, She began her film journey from movie "Jatt and Juliet". She has played roles in Punjabi movies like "Jatt Airways", "Bhaji in Problem", "Jatt Boys – Putt Jattan De", "Angrej", "Fer Mamla Gadbad Gadbad", "Bazz", "Teshan", "Nikka Zaildar", "Manje Bistre", Puaada and many more.

Singing career 
Apart from acting, Nisha Bano is famous for duet singing with Karamjit Anmol. She sung various Punjabi songs as Playback Singer for Punjabi Movies, such as "Morni", "Mai Chadta", "Mere Wala Jatt".

References 

People from Mansa district, India
1984 births
Living people
Actresses from Punjab, India
Punjabi-language singers
Punjabi singers
Punjabi people
Indian film actresses
Actresses in Punjabi cinema
21st-century Indian actresses
21st-century Indian singers